The Norwegian Press Complaints Commission is a complaint commission of Norwegian Press Association.

The members of the commission from are (from July 2012 to July 2014):

Representing the press:
Hilde Haugsgjerd (leader), editor of Aftenposten
Håkon Borud, editor of Tønsberg Blad
Line Noer Borrevik (deputy leader), journalist for Stavanger Aftenblad
Øyvind Brigg, journalist for TV 2

Representing the general public: 
Henrik Syse
Eva Sannum
Hadi Strømmen Lile

References

External links
http://klassekampen.no/59680/article/item/null/mener-pressen-er-selvgod

Norwegian journalism organisations